In mathematics,  a lattice word (or lattice permutation) is a string composed of positive integers, in which every prefix contains at least as many positive integers i as integers i + 1. 

A reverse lattice word, or Yamanouchi word, is a string whose reversal is a lattice word.

Examples 

For instance, 11122121 is a lattice permutation, so 12122111 is a Yamanouchi word, but 12122111 is not a lattice permutation, since the sub-word 12122 contains more two's than one's.

See also 
 Dyck word

References

Algebraic combinatorics
Combinatorics on words